WEPL-LP is a low-power radio station based in Rochester, New York, broadcasting at 97.1 on the FM band. The station is owned and operated by the Ibero-American Action League as a service to the Latino community in Rochester. The station, branded as PODER 97.1, features Latin music interspersed with Spanish-language news and talk. It began broadcasting in its current format on November 30, 2015.

External links

EPL-LP
EPL-LP
Radio stations established in 2016
2016 establishments in New York (state)